The American Civil War, fought between the Union and Confederate forces, took place from 1861 to 1865. During the war, a variety of weapons were used on both sides. These weapons include edged weapons such as knives, swords, and bayonets, firearms such as rifled muskets, breech-loaders and repeating weapons, various artillery such as field guns and siege guns and new weapons such as the early grenade and landmine.

The Civil War is often referred as one of the first "modern" wars in history as it included the most advanced technology and innovations of warfare available at the time. Some of the advances and innovations of the Civil War included mass production of war materiel, rifling of gun barrels and the use of the Minié ball, the advent of repeating firearms and metallic cartridges, transportation railroads with armed locomotives, ironclad warships, submarines, one of the first uses of air corps for aerial reconnaissance, communication (especially the telegraph), advances in medicine and the gradual decline of tactics from previous centuries.

Personal weapons

Edged weapons

In 1862 Joseph E. Brown governor of Georgia, proposed issuing pikes to the State militia to compensate for the shortage of guns. Thousands were made and issued but not known to have been used in combat.

Sidearms

Some Confederate cavalry units were equipped with single-shot caplock or even flintlock pistols early in the war. Some pistols were of the military make and had been issued to the US Army but were obsolete by the time of the Civil War due to the introduction of revolvers.

Rifles and muskets

The .69 caliber muskets (mostly percussion, but some flintlocks as well) were common in the early part of the war (either in their original form or converted to rifling). Early in the war the Confederates used civilian firearms including shotguns and hunting arms like the Kentucky and Pennsylvania rifle due to the shortage of military weapons. The British officer Arthur Fremantle observed that revolvers and shotguns (especially double barreled models) were the favored weapons of Confederate cavalry and mounted infantry during his 1863 visit to the South.

Grenades

The American Civil War belligerents did have crude hand grenades equipped with a plunger that would detonate upon. The Union relied on experimental Ketchum grenades with a wooden tail to ensure the nose would strike the target and start the fuse. The Confederacy used spherical hand grenades that weighed about six pounds sometimes with a paper fuse. They also used Rains and Adams grenades which were similar to the Ketchum in appearance and firing mechanism.

Landmines

Originally developed by General Gabriel J. Rains, were typically iron containers, loaded with gunpowder, a fuse and also a brass detonation cap. Some of these still-activated landmines were recovered in Alabama in the 1960s.

Landmines were an intimidating method of psychological warfare but were viewed as unethical. Union General William T. Sherman also hated them and declared them as not warfare but murder. Confederate General James Longstreet banned their use for a time.

Rapid fire weapons

Similar weapons of the Union included the .58 caliber Ager machine gun also known as "coffee-mill gun" which was similar to the Claxton machine gun. Like the Gatling I and Gatling II machine gun, the cartridges of Ager's invention were fed by a hand crank with a hopper on top and had a steel guard, and this is why some people believe that President Lincoln called it "the coffee grinder gun". Other infantry support weapons included the Billinghurst Requa Battery volley gun which had eight banks of cartridge chambers that were rotated into alignment behind the row of 25 barrels.

Chief of Ordnance, General James Wolfe Ripley was against issuing repeating rifles and rapid fire weapons to the Union army as he believed it would waste ammunition. Nevertheless, several generals, including General Benjamin Butler and General Winfield Scott Hancock, purchased Gatling machine guns that were the logical outgrowth of the trends portrayed in the Ager machine gun and the Ripley machine gun.

The Confederacy used the single barrel hand cranked Williams machine gun that was similar to the single barrel hand cranked Gorgas machine gun and the Vandenberg volley gun that was similar to the French De Reffye mitrailleuse and the Belgian Montigny mitrailleuse.

Artillery

Field artillery
Siege artillery

Special weapons

Congreve rocket
Hale rocket launcher
Sea mine
Winans Steam Gun

Vehicles

Animals

Horse

Carriages

Horse drawn carriages
Steam powered carriages

Trains

BLW Armed train

Ships

Ships of the Union Navy
Ships of the Confederate Navy

Submarines

USS Alligator
CSS Hunley
CSS Pioneer
CSS Pioneer II (Also known as CSS American diver)
CSS Bayou Saint John

Aircraft

Air balloons

Union Army Balloon Corps
Confederate Army Balloon Corps

Airships

Andrews Aereon airship

See also

French weapons in the American Civil War

References

Bibliography

List of contracts made with the approval or by the direction of the Secretary of War between April 12, 1861 and January 31, 1862

External links
Weapons of the Civil War at Smithsonian
Small Arms of the Civil War
Artillery, small arms, and edged weapons
Field Artillery of the Civil War
Civil War Small Arms. National Park Service. Accessed 14 July 2008.
Weapon: Burnside Carbine. Antietam on the web. Accessed 15 July 2008.

American Civil War weapons
Weapons
Weapons
American Civil War
American Civil War